= Tuitionkit =

Online learning website

- Company type: Private
- Industry: Education
- Founder: Leon Hady
- Headquarters: United Kingdom
- Area served: Global
- Key people: Leon Hady
- Services: Online tuition, model answers, video tutorials
- Website: tuitionkit.com

Tuitionkit is a UK-based online learning website for academic subjects such as English, Mathematics and Science. The website mainly focuses on structured video learning.

== History ==
The website was founded in 2015 by Leon Hady, a former UK headteacher. Tuitionkit started as a self-funded venture allowing students to view interactive video content to support revision in Maths, English and Science for GCSE and A Levels. As of November 2016 it has 20,000 users.

Leon, who has been guiding pupils online since 2009 through YouTube channels, founded the website with the core focus of building a video platform that avoided displaying adverts to students (such as in the case of viewing tutorials on websites like YouTube) as well as making it a cheap alternative to in-person tuition.

The Tuitionkit subscription service allows students to watch over 2,000 tutorials as well as review more than 500 model exam question answers. Additionally, this is done with a track of the students' learning progress and an in-video questioning. The website also includes additional tools for teachers to use and teacher training videos.

Future expansions of the website include learning rooms in Egypt and Brazil among others.
